KPSP-CD (channel 38) is a low-power, Class A television station licensed to Cathedral City, California, United States, serving the Coachella Valley as an affiliate of CBS. It is owned by the News-Press & Gazette Company alongside Palm Springs–licensed ABC affiliate KESQ-TV (channel 42) and four other low-power stations: Class A Fox affiliate KDFX-CD (channel 33, licensed to both Indio and Palm Springs), Palm Springs–licensed CW affiliate KCWQ-LD (channel 2), Indio-licensed Telemundo affiliate KUNA-LD (channel 15), and AccuWeather affiliate KYAV-LD (channel 12). The six stations share studios on Dunham Way in Thousand Palms; KPSP-CD's transmitter is located on Edom Hill northeast of Cathedral City and I-10.

Along with other major Coachella Valley television stations, KPSP identifies itself on-air using its cable designation (CBS Local 2) rather than its over-the-air channel position. The unusual practice stems in part from the area's exceptionally high cable penetration rate of 80.5% which is one of the highest in the United States.

In addition to its own digital signal, KPSP is simulcast in standard definition on KESQ's second digital subchannel (virtual and UHF channel 42.2) from the same Edom Hill transmitter facility.

History

The station launched September 2, 2002, and aired an analog signal on UHF channel 38. Prior to its sign-on as the Coachella Valley's first ever CBS affiliate, programming from the network came into the market via cable or antenna (in some areas) through Los Angeles owned-and-operated station KCBS-TV. When KPSP went on-the-air, area cable companies displaced KCBS at that outlet's request. KPSP adopted the "CBS 2" moniker following the practice of major local competitors in using its cable designation for branding purposes.

On April 1, 2008, it switched from branding itself "CBS 2" to "KPSP Local 2" although the "CBS 2" logo was retained for several months afterwards. On January 31, 2012, KPSP was sold by Desert Television to the News-Press & Gazette Company becoming a sister station to KESQ. It moved from its own studios on Dunham Way in Thousand Palms to KESQ's facility in Palm Desert. KPSP's transmitter on 38.1, went silent at midnight on March 1, 2012; the station's license was not initially included in the deal. CBS programming is now broadcast on 42.2 on the KESQ-DT digital tier and the lineup has not changed. In January 2013, News Press & Gazette acquired the KPSP-CD license, as well as KYAV-LD, from Desert Television. The Class A channel 38 digital transmitter was turned back on on February 7, allowing CBS programming to be shown over the air in 1080i high definition for the first time in nearly a year. NPG's acquisition of the Desert Television assets was completed on April 26.

Programming

Syndicated programming
Syndicated programming on KPSP includes The Good Dish, 25 Words or Less, You Bet Your Life, and Dr. Phil among others. The station also airs syndicated reruns of The Big Bang Theory and its spin-off Young Sheldon, both of which first-ran on CBS.

News operation
At one point while operating as a separate entity, KPSP aired its early weeknight newscast from 5:00 to 6:30 advertising the slot as a single 90-minute newscast. The CBS Evening News would therefore be seen in the regular time period at 6:30. The station would eventually move the CBS Evening News to 5:30 p.m.

After KPSP was acquired by KESQ, this station had its operations temporarily merged into that outlet's facility. Local news offerings on both outlets were adjusted as a result. Later, both stations moved back to the Dunham Way location and operated separately out of different studios for seven years. On December 2, 2018, the CBS Local 2 news brand was discontinued and all news offerings on CBS Local 2 were offered under a unified News Channel 3 branding. The staff previously assigned to CBS Local 2 newscasts were folded into the News Channel 3 brand on all stations. On April 24, 2019, the space previously occupied by the CBS Local 2 news set was launched with a new set supporting the local Telemundo affiliate's Spanish newscasts.

Fox affiliate KDFX-CD airs a nightly hour prime time newscast at 10:00 produced by KESQ featuring the News Channel 3 branding and anchors. The program competes with low-powered MyNetworkTV affiliate KPSG-LP (now KPSE-LD), which had local news seen for thirty minutes at the same time produced by rival NBC affiliate KMIR-TV.

Notable former staff
Adrianna Costa (has since worked as Entertainment Reporter for Good Day L.A., E! Network, CNN, TV Guide Network, Access Hollywood and Extra.)
Rich Fields (former announcer of The Price Is Right on CBS; later with KCBS-TV/KCAL-TV in Los Angeles and WTSP in Tampa)
David Garcia (host of Eye on Riverside County newsmagazine; died in 2007)

Technical information

Subchannels
The station's digital signal is multiplexed:

See also
Channel 2 branded TV stations in the United States
Channel 18 digital TV stations in the United States
Channel 18 low-power TV stations in the United States
Channel 38 virtual TV stations in the United States

References

External links
KESQ-TV "News Channel 3 HD"
KCWQ-LP/LD "Palm Springs CW 5"
KUNA-LD "Telemundo 15"

PSP-CD
Cathedral City, California
News-Press & Gazette Company
CBS network affiliates
Television channels and stations established in 2002
2002 establishments in California
Low-power television stations in the United States